Dvorište  may refer to:

Croatia
 Dvorišće, previously known as Dvorište, a village near Glina
 Dvorište, Karlovac County, a village near Krnjak

Czech Republic
 Dvořiště, a fish pond in the Czech Republic

North Macedonia
 Dvorište, Berovo, a village
 Dvorište, Gradsko, a village in Gradsko Municipality

Serbia
 Dvorište (Despotovac), a village
 Dvorište (Golubac), a village
 Dvorište (Šabac), a village